Two ships of the United States Navy have been named Courser for one who moves from one point to another, or pursues a quarry.

 , was a World War II coastal minesweeper.
 , was laid down 28 August 1942 as YMS-201 by the Hiltebrant Dry Dock Company, in Kingston, New York.

References 
 

United States Navy ship names